The cue sports competition at the 2013 World Games, including three-cushion billiards, nine-ball (a pool discipline) and snooker, took place from July 26 to 30 at the Unidad Deportiva Alberto Galindo in Cali, Colombia.

Medal table

Medals summary

References

 
2013 World Games
2013
World Games
Cue sports in Colombia